Henrik Dettmann (born 5 April 1958) is a Finnish professional basketball coach who last served as head coach of the French LNB Pro A team SIG Strasbourg and the Finnish national basketball team. He was the head coach of German national basketball team from 1997 to 2004, winning the bronze medal at the 2002 FIBA World Championship.

Coaching history
World Cup
 Finland: 2014
 Germany: 2002

EuroBasket
 Finland: 1995, 2011, 2013, 2017
 Germany: 1999, 2001, 2003

References

1958 births
Living people
Basketball Löwen Braunschweig coaches
Finnish basketball coaches
Finnish expatriate basketball people in France
Finnish expatriate basketball people in Germany
Finnish expatriate basketball people in Turkey
Mitteldeutscher BC coaches
SIG Basket coaches
Sportspeople from Helsinki
Swedish-speaking Finns